The 2021 Pakistani Senate election was held on 3  March 2021.  The Election commission of Pakistan announced the election schedule on 11 February 2021. 52 of the 104 Senators had retired on 7 February 2021. After the merger of the Federally Administered Tribal Areas with Khyber Pakhtunkhawa, FATA seats were abolished and there was no election on 4 of the 8 seats. The rest of the 4 seats will be abolished in 2024. Official results of the Senate Elections were announced by the Election Commission of Pakistan on 10 March 2021.

Background 
This year's election were being conducted amidst an anti-government drive by a coalition of opposition parties, the Pakistan Democratic Movement (PDM). The PDM leaders had earlier threatened to resign en masse from the provincial and national assemblies, and refused to take part in the Senate elections but later relented.

In the lead up to the elections much of the debate surrounded the secrecy of ballot that is observed in the Senate elections, which has always led to allegations of vote trading. The government moved a conditional presidential ordinance and later sought the opinion of the Supreme Court of Pakistan to conduct the elections via open ballot. The Supreme Court, in its judgment, maintained that the elections should by held via secret ballot but their secrecy is not absolute and that the Election Commission of Pakistan (ECP) should employ the latest technology to ensure "that the election is conducted honestly, justly, fairly and in accordance with law and that corrupt practices are guarded against." ECP, in response to the Court's directives, stated that this year's elections will be conducted as per past practice due to the dearth of time.

A night before the election, a video emerged that showed Ali Haider Gillani, son of Yousaf Raza Gillani, lobbying for his father's election bid and showing three government lawmakers how to void their votes. An audio recording also surfaced, with Nasir Hussain Shah giving assurances to Pakistan Tehreek-e-Insaf lawmakers who had allegedly sold their votes.

Results 
Overall, Pakistan Tehreek-e-Insaf (PTI) became the largest party in the Senate as it won the most seats, securing 18 of the 48 senate seats up for election; of which 10 came from Khyber Pakhtunkhwa, 5 from Punjab, 2 from Sindh, and one from Islamabad. Pakistan Peoples Party (PPP) came in second by winning 8 seats, of which 7 were won in Sindh and one in Islamabad. Balochistan Awami Party was declared victorious on 6 seats - all from Balochistan. Finally, the Pakistan Muslim League (N) lost its majority in the Senate as it could only manage 5 seats from Punjab against 16 retiring senators.

After the results were declared, much of the focus was on the Islamabad General seat won by PPP's Yousaf Raza Gillani where he beat PTI's incumbent finance minister, Abdul Hafeez Shaikh, by a margin of 5 votes. Although, Gillani was the opposition's joint candidate, he still did not have the required majority unless those on the treasury benches voted for him or intentionally voided their votes in the secret ballot. This fact, coupled with the leaked video of his son, led to PTI petitioning the Election Commission of Pakistan against his victory.

Meanwhile, Gurdeep Singh of the PTI, became the first Sikh to be elected to the Senate of Pakistan as he won the minority seat from Khyber Pakhtunkhwa.

Abdul Qadir, who had won as an Independent from Balochistan, later joined the PTI, increasing the tally of the party to 26 in the Senate.

Results by Administrative Unit 
The successful candidates for each of the seats were declared on 10 March 2021.

Provinces

Federally Administered Unit

Election of Chairman and Deputy Chairman
Two candidates apiece, from the opposition and treasury benches, contested the elections on 12 March 2021. Treasury candidates, Sadiq Sanjrani and Mirza Muhammad Afridi, won the elections for their respective seats.

References

Senate elections in Pakistan
2021 elections in Pakistan